The 1996 British Academy Television Awards were held on 21 April 1996 at London's Theatre Royal, Drury Lane followed by dinner in The Great Room, Grosvenor House Hotel, as a joint ceremony with the British Academy Film Awards.

Winners and nominees
Winners are listed first and highlighted in boldface; the nominees are listed below.

Craft Awards
{| class=wikitable
|-
!style="background:#BDB76B;" |Best Costume Design
!style="background:#BDB76B;" |Best Original Television Music
|-
|valign="top" |
 Persuasion – Alexandra Byrne
 The Hanging Gale – Howard Burden
 Pride and Prejudice – Dinah Collin
 Performance: Henry IV – Joan Wadge
|valign="top" |
 Persuasion – Jeremy Sams Signs and Wonders – Daemion Barry
 The Hanging Gale – Shaun Davey
 Cracker – Rick Wentworth
|-
|-
!style="background:#BDB76B;" |Best Design
!style="background:#BDB76B;" |Best Make-Up
|-
|valign="top" |
 Persuasion – William Dudley, Brian Sykes The Buccaneers – Tony Burrough
 The Hanging Gale – Tim Hutchinson
 Cold Comfort Farm – Malcolm Thornton
|valign="top" |
 Cold Comfort Farm – Dorka Nieradzik Pride and Prejudice – Caroline Noble
 Persuasion – Jean Speak
 Cotham: The Buccaneers – Christine Walmesley
|-
|-
!style="background:#BDB76B;" |Best Photography - Factual
!style="background:#BDB76B;" |Best Photography and Lighting - Fiction
|-
|valign="top" |
 True Stories: The Betrayed – Jacek Petrycki Wildlife: Great White Shark - The True Story Of Jaws (Special) – Paul Atkins, Peter, Scoones, Doug Allen
 Secret Asia: The Dying Rooms – Peter Hugh, Brian Woods
 The Homecoming – Jacek Petrycki
|valign="top" |
 Persuasion – John Daly The Politician's Wife – Tom McDougal
 McCallum – Brian Morgan
 Prime Suspect – David Odd
|-
|-
!style="background:#BDB76B;" |Best Editing - Factual
!style="background:#BDB76B;" |Best Editing - Fiction/Entertainment
|-
|valign="top" |
 True Stories: The Betrayed – Graham Shrimpton The Private Life of Plants – Tim Coope, Jo Payne, Martin Elsbury
 The Beatles Anthology – Andy Matthews
 HMS Brilliant – Andy Willsmore, Tony Heavan
|valign="top" |
 Love Bites: Go Now – Trevor Waite The Politician's Wife – Alan Jones
 Cracker – Edward Mansell
 The Buccaneers – Greg Miller
|-
|-
!style="background:#BDB76B;" |Best Sound - Factual
!style="background:#BDB76B;" |Best Sound - Fiction/Entertainment
|-
|valign="top" |
 The Beatles Anthology – Howie Nicol, Richard King, Andy Matthews, Danny Longhurst HMS Brilliant – Adrian Bell, Tony Anscombe, Trish Stephenson, Gary McIntyre
 True Stories: The Betrayed – Patrick Bolland, Michael Narduzzo
 The Private Life of Plants – Trevor Gosling, Lucy Rutherford, Martin Harries, Peter Hicks
|valign="top" |
 Love Bites: Loved Up – John Taylor, Craig Irving, Tim Hudnott, Pete Collins, Chris Graver Four Goes To Glyndebourne: Ermione – John Middleton, Andy Rose
 The Choir – Derek Norman, Chris Graver, Keith Marriner
 Prime Suspect – Nick Steer, John Rutherford, John Senior, John Whitworth
|-
|-
!style="background:#BDB76B;" |Best Graphic Design
|-
|valign="top" |
 BBC2 Christmas Animations – Iain Greenway, Jane Wyatt BBC1 Winter Animations – Mark Chaudoir, Paula Williams
 Have I Got News For You – Tim Searle
 American Football: Blitz – Susan Young Limited
|-
|-
|}

Special Awards
 Camera Team – Survival'' BBC'''

Footnotes

References

External links
British Academy Craft Awards official website

1996
British Academy Television Award
British Academy Television Award
British Academy Television Award
British Academy Television Awards
British Academy Television Award